World's Strongest Man is the third studio album by British musician Gaz Coombes. It was released on 4 May 2018, by Hot Fruit Recordings. The album charted at number 12 on the UK Albums Chart

Critical reception

World's Strongest Man was met with "generally favorable" reviews from critics. At Metacritic, which assigns a weighted average rating out of 100 to reviews from mainstream publications, this release received an average score of 80, based on 12 reviews. 

Stephen Thomas Erlewine of AllMusic said of the album: "Coombes is exploring the outer reaches of his psyche, camouflaging his anxiety underneath shimmering synths, drum loops, and guitars that aren't so much strummed as used for waves of textures. It is clearly cut together on computer, with dense rhythms competing with smooth surfaces - but also not chasing pop trends. Instead, it's a mature modern album." Lisa Wright from DIY noted: "Continuing his route into more elegiac, introverted territory, Gaz’s third solo offering continues to find him moving into his next phase with real class."

Accolades

Track listing

Personnel
Credits adapted from AllMusic

Musicians
 Gaz Coombes – primary artist, mixing, producer
 Nick Fowler – bass, guitar
 Colin Greenwood – bass
 Garo Nahoulakian – piano
 Beverlei Brown – backing vocals
 Faith Simpson – backing vocals
 Loz Colbert – backing vocals
 Gita Langley – violin

Production
 Ian Davenport – producer
 Bob Ludwig – mastering
 Craig Silvey – mixer

Charts

References

2018 albums
Gaz Coombes albums